Radek Tejml (born 30 September 1967) is a retired Czech football defender.

References

1967 births
Living people
Czech footballers
SK Dynamo České Budějovice players
FC Slovan Liberec players
AFK Atlantic Lázně Bohdaneč players
Czechoslovak First League players
Czech First League players
Association football defenders
Czech expatriate footballers
Expatriate footballers in Austria
Czech expatriate sportspeople in Austria
Sportspeople from České Budějovice